Antaeotricha nitidorella is a moth in the family Depressariidae. It was described by Francis Walker in 1864. It is found in Amazonas, Brazil.

Adults are brownish silvery white, the hindwings semihyaline (almost glassy).

References

Moths described in 1864
nitidorella
Moths of South America